Leslie Harvey was a Scottish guitarist

Leslie or Les Harvey may also refer to:
Leslie Harvey (RAF officer) (1896–1972), British Royal Air Force officer 
Les Harvey (footballer) (1909–1990), Australian footballer for Collingwood
Leslie Harvey Eyres (1892–1983), Canadian businessman and politician